Andrew Simons (born 13 June 1961) is an Australian former professional rugby league footballer who played for the North Sydney Bears and the Penrith Panthers.

Biography
Simons grew up in the North Shore of Sydney and started his first-grade career with North Sydney, where his brother Jeff Simons played in the late 1970s.

A winger, Simons debuted for North Sydney in the 1982 NSWRL season and featured in every game from the second round onwards, including two finals. He amassed a total of 105 first-grade appearances while at North Sydney and was the club's top try scorer with 11 tries in 1988, his final season.

In 1989 he joined Penrith and had the distinction of scoring a try in each of the first six rounds that season. He didn't miss a game all year for Penrith and played in the second finals series of his career.

Following the 1990 season, Simons left Penrith to play at Byron Bay.

References

External links
Andrew Simons at Rugby League project

1961 births
Living people
Australian rugby league players
Rugby league players from Sydney
Rugby league wingers
North Sydney Bears players
Penrith Panthers players